Tong Jian (born August 15, 1979 in Harbin, Heilongjiang) is a Chinese retired pair skater. With his wife Pang Qing, he is the 2010 Olympic silver medalist, 2006 and 2010 World Champion, a five-time Four Continents champion (2002, 2004, 2008, 2009 and 2011) and the 2008 Grand Prix Final Champion.

Career
Tong was born into a Manchurian family in the city of Harbin, China, the home of Chinese pair skating. He began skating at age six. He originally competed as a single skater. He then competed as an ice dancer for two years because of his weak jumps. After his short ice dancing career, Tong switched to pairs. He previously competed with Zhang Xiwen. In 1993, coach Yao Bin teamed him up with Qing and they have been skating together ever since.

When Yao moved to Beijing, Pang and Tong trained without a coach until 1997, when they began training under Yao again.

Pang and Tong did not have a strong junior career, perhaps due to the fact that the Junior Grand Prix did not exist when they were skating at the junior level. They placed 14th, 9th, and 8th at the World Junior Championships between 1997 and 1999. After that, they went senior.

Pang and Tong won the silver medal at the 1997 Chinese national championships, but did not represent China at the World Championships until 1999. They are the 2000 Chinese national champions. At their first major senior international, the 1999 Four Continents Championships (the first Four Continents ever held), they placed 5th. They then went to their first Worlds, where they placed 14th.

In the 1999–2000 season, Pang and Tong made their Grand Prix debut. They placed 4th at Skate Canada and 5th at Cup of Russia. They slowly moved up the ranks over the years. At the 2002 Winter Olympics, coming in as the Four Continents Champions, they placed 9th.

Following the 2001–2002 season, Pang and Tong began to be contenders. They consistently placed on the podium at their Grand Prix events. They won their first World medal (a bronze) at the 2004 World Championships.

After their first world medal, they had a rough 2004–2005 season and a shaky start at the beginning of the 2005–2006 season. They recovered with consistency by the 2006 Olympics, where they placed a controversial 4th behind teammates Shen Xue & Hongbo Zhao and Zhang Dan & Zhang Hao.  They went to the 2006 Worlds and won it.

In the 2006–2007 season, Pang and Tong were unable to defend their World title. They were forced to withdraw from Skate America due to injury. They won the silver medal at the Cup of China, the Asian Winter Games, and the Four Continents Championships. At Worlds, they placed second.

During the 2007–2008 season, Pang and Tong had a rough start, losing two out of their three Grand Prix events. They came back strong midseason by winning the bronze at the Grand Prix Final and their third Four Continents title. They ended their season with a disappointing 5th at the World Championships.

During the 2008–2009 season, Pang and Tong had another rough outing at their first event, the Cup of China. Despite this, they went on the two win their next Grand Prix events and the final. During that season, they made history, when they went on to win a record setting fourth Four Continents title and have now won more Four Continent titles than any other person. Despite the momentum they had built, they had another disappointing World Championships, where they were once again finished the podium.

During the 2009–2010 season, Pang and Tong won both of their Grand Prix events and a silver at the Grand Prix Final, defeating all the world medalists at the previous world championship.

In the 2010 Winter Olympics, Pang and Tong set a new World Record for the free skate with a score of 141.81 points. They placed second place behind Shen Xue and Hongbo Zhao thanks to their teammates world record-setting short program. The People's Republic of China broke Russia's 46-year twelve Olympic gold medal streak in pairs skating, sweeping gold and silver places. Pang and Tong became the 2010 World Champions in Turin, Italy.

For the 2010–2011 ISU Grand Prix season, Pang and Tong were assigned to the 2010 NHK Trophy and to the 2010 Cup of China. They won both of their Grand Prix assignments to qualify for the Grand Prix Final where they won silver. They won the bronze medal at the 2011 World Championships.

Pang and Tong withdrew from their assigned 2011–12 Grand Prix events, however, returned to 
competition in January 2012, where they won gold at the Chinese National Winter Games. They earned first-place marks in the short program (70.24) and free skate (126.31). They competed at and finished fourth at the 2012 World Championships in what was their only ISU international event of the season.

For the 2012–13 season, Pang and Tong medaled at both their Grand Prix events, taking second at 2012 Skate America and first at 2012 Cup of China. They went on to win the bronze at the 2012–13 Grand Prix of Figure Skating Final. They were fifth at the 2013 World Figure Skating Championships.

During the 2013–14 season, Pang and Tong finished second at 2013 Cup of China and first at 2013 Trophée Éric Bompard before winning bronze again at the 2013–14 Grand Prix of Figure Skating Final. They went on to finish fourth at the 2014 Winter Olympics, their fourth consecutive Olympic Games.

For the 2014–15 season, Pang and Tong competed at the 2015 Four Continents Figure Skating Championships and 2015 World Figure Skating Championships, placing third at both events.

Personal life
Although they had not spoken about their personal lives, Pang and Tong revealed publicly in an issue of Vanity Fair during the 2010 Winter Olympics that they were romantically involved.

In June 2011, the pair became engaged after Tong proposed on-ice to Pang at a show in Shanghai. They got married on June 18, 2016.

Programs

Competitive highlights
(with Pang)

Detailed results

References

External links

 
 Official website

1979 births
Chinese male pair skaters
Olympic figure skaters of China
Figure skaters at the 2002 Winter Olympics
Figure skaters at the 2006 Winter Olympics
Figure skaters at the 2010 Winter Olympics
Figure skaters at the 2014 Winter Olympics
Living people
Olympic silver medalists for China
Figure skaters from Harbin
Olympic medalists in figure skating
World Figure Skating Championships medalists
Four Continents Figure Skating Championships medalists
Medalists at the 2010 Winter Olympics
Asian Games medalists in figure skating
Figure skaters at the 2003 Asian Winter Games
Figure skaters at the 2007 Asian Winter Games
Figure skaters at the 2011 Asian Winter Games
Asian Games gold medalists for China
Asian Games silver medalists for China
Medalists at the 2003 Asian Winter Games
Medalists at the 2007 Asian Winter Games
Medalists at the 2011 Asian Winter Games
Universiade medalists in figure skating
Manchu sportspeople
Universiade silver medalists for China
Competitors at the 1999 Winter Universiade